All Is Forgiven is the second studio album by Australian rock band Tex, Don and Charlie. It was released in September 2005 and peaked at number 58 on the Australian albums chart.

In 2005, The album was shortlisted for the Australian Music Prize.

Details
The song "You're 39, You're Beautiful & You're Mine" was written by Paul Kelly. Perkins said, "I was on a mission to get good songs, no matter where they came from. I basically just spoke to every great songwriter I came across and got down on my knees and said, 'Pleeeeease! I've got nothing! I've got nothing!' So he threw me a bone."

Walker later said of his song "Harry was a Bad Bugger", "The subject matter is a combination of three blokes that I knew when I was young in Grafton. These were older guys who were part of the bodgie generation who had washed up in regional Australia. Guys who were five or ten years older than me and are cunning as all fuck, never short of money but never have any visible means of support, utterly ruthless with anybody around them, and devastatingly attractive because of that."

Promotional video
The album was promoted with a short film, written and directed by Karen Borger, which included a special edit to be used as the music video for the group's single, Whenever it Snows. Band member Owen said "The record company came up with the idea, instead of making just a video, they thought we could make this so they can show it in other places rather than the rock video format." The short film won Best Film, Wollombi Film Festival (NSW Australia), screened at St Kilda Film Festival (Victoria, Australia) and was selected for 'Best of the Fest' traveling film festival (across Australia). It screened at Woodford Folk Festival, Queensland on New Year's Eve and at the Australian Film Weekend in Toronto, Ontario Canada w. feature film 'The Proposition'. The film has been screened repeatedly on RAGE - ABC TV, Australia.

Reception

"Harry was a Bad Bugger" was described by Chris Johnston as, " a Slim Dusty meets Wolf Creek kind of tune - the Australian song of the year", by Mess & Noise as, "one of the finest Australian compositions of the last 20 years", and The West Australian as a "lyrical masterpiece".

Track listing

Personnel
Tex Perkins – vocals, guitar
Don Walker – vocals, piano, keyboards
Charlie Owen – guitar, dobro
Shane Walsh – double bass
Jim White – drums
Kim Salmon – jew's harp
Garrett Costigan – pedal steel guitar

Charts

Release history

References

External links
 
 
 

2005 albums
Tex, Don and Charlie albums